The lèine bhàn, literally meaning White Shirt (in Scottish Gaelic), was a distinctive smock which transgressors of ecclesiastical law, in Scotland, were at one time obliged to wear in church during public worship on one or more Sundays – also called gùn odhar (dun gown), and gùn na h-eaglaise (church gown).

References

Sources 
 

Religious clothing
History of Christianity in Scotland
Church of Scotland
Church order
Church discipline
Christian law
Scottish clothing